Tephritis dilacerata is a species of tephritid or fruit flies in the genus Tephritis of the family Tephritidae.

References

Tephritinae